Typhina is a genus of sea snails, marine gastropod mollusks in the subfamily Typhinae of the family Muricidae, the murex snails or rock snails.

It was first described by Félix Pierre Jousseaume in 1880.

Species
Species within the genus Typhina include:
 † Typhina alata (Sowerby, 1850 )  
 Typhina belcheri (Broderip, 1833)
 Typhina campbelli (Radwin & D'Attilio, 1976)
 † Typhina canaliculata Landau & Houart, 2014 
 Typhina carolskoglundae (Houart & Hertz, 2006)
 Typhina clarki (Keen & G. B. Campbell, 1964)
 Typhina clarksoni Houart, Buge & Zuccon, 2021
 Typhina claydoni (Houart, 1988)
 Typhina coronata (Broderip, 1833)
 † Typhina cryptica Merle & Pacaud, 2019 
 Typhina expansa (G.B. Sowerby II, 1874)<ref></ref>
 Typhina gabonensis (Garrigues, 2021)
 Typhina grandis (A. Adams, 1855)
 Typhina lamyi (Garrigues & Merle, 2014)
 Typhina latipennis (Dall, 1919)
 Typhina neocaledonica (Houart, 1987)
 Typhina nitens (Hinds, 1843)
 Typhina pallida (Garrigues, 2021)
 Typhina puertoricensis (Warmke, 1964)
 † Typhina radulfiensis Merle & Pacaud, 2019 
 † Typhina rutoti (Cossmann, 1882) 
 † Typhina subburdigalensis Lozouet, 1999 
Synonyms
 Typhina pavlova Iredale, 1936: synonym of Choreotyphis pavlova (Iredale, 1936) (original combination)
 Typhina ramosa (Habe & Kosuge, 1971): synonym of Typhis ramosus Habe & Kosuge, 1971
 Typhina riosi Bertsch & D'Attilio, 1980: synonym of Siphonochelus riosi (Bertsch & D'Attilio, 1980) (original combination)

References

 Spencer, H.G., Marshall, B.A. & Willan, R.C. (2009). Checklist of New Zealand living Mollusca. Pp 196-219. in: Gordon, D.P. (ed.) New Zealand inventory of biodiversity. Volume one. Kingdom Animalia: Radiata, Lophotrochozoa, Deuterostomia. Canterbury University Press, Christchurch.
 Houart, R, Buge, B. & Zuccon, D. (2021). A taxonomic update of the Typhinae (Gastropoda: Muricidae) with a review of New Caledonia species and the description of new species from New Caledonia, the South China Sea and Western Australia. Journal of Conchology. 44(2): 103–147.

External links
 Jousseaume, F. P. (1880). Division méthodique de la famille des Purpuridés. Le Naturaliste. 2(42): 335-338
 Jousseaume, F. (1882). Etude des Purpuridae et description d'espèces nouvelles. Revue et Magasin de Zoologie. ser. 3, 7: 314-348

 
Muricidae
Gastropod genera
Gastropods described in 1880
Taxa named by Félix Pierre Jousseaume